Charles Wish (born, Los Angeles, California, 1971) is an American painter best known for visually fusing Regionalism imagery with 9th - 19th century South Asian symbolism and motifs. (Debut show: CPop Gallery, Detroit, Michigan - 2005)

Confronting the information age challenges of extreme cultural contrariety and cross-cultural interaction, as well as America’s own internal culture war, Wish draws from a diverse range of influences to deliver his style of "agrariadelic" paintings. Citing various artists of the far-east, along with American painters including: Grant Wood and Thomas Hart Benton, Wish thoughtfully combines the imagery of an esoteric philosophy with some of rural-America’s most selfsame figures and scenes.

After spending four years (1999–2003) at a Ramakrishna, Hindu monastery, as a student of South-Asian culture and personal assistant to Swami Swahananda, Wish would return to the San Fernando Valley, California. It would be here, not far from where he spent his formative years, where he would set up his first studio and launch his art career. Wish now maintains two studios, the original in Southern California and one in Elk County, PA, where he and his wife are restoring and converting a large Federal-style building into a cultural center and community creative space.

Collections

Gary Pressman
Tom Thewes
Nederlander Organization
Debi Jacobson
Greg Escalante
Lee Ving
Vedanta Society of Southern California
Topher Crowder
Dead Meadow
Robert Evans (photographer)

Influences
 Regionalism
 Tibetan art (Menri-Karma Gadri styles)
 Shakta, Tantra & Vajrayana imagery
 Kerala mural, Rajput, Pahari & Kalighat painting
 Classic Animation & Illustration
 Native American art
 Delta Blues culture
 Various Modern art
 Punk Rock culture

References

Sources
The Detroit News Joy Hakanson Colby (Art Critic, jcolby@detnews.com), July 2, 2005.
St. Marys Daily Press, July 7, 2007.
Charles Wish Bio, Kristy Raine (Librarian/Archivist, Mount Mercy College, IA, kraine@mtmercy.edu) May 18, 2006.

External links
Charles Wish's official website
Adrian College, Adrian, Michigan

1971 births
Living people
20th-century American painters
American male painters
21st-century American painters
21st-century American male artists
Los Angeles Pierce College people
20th-century American male artists